The Regency is a greyhound competition held at Brighton & Hove Greyhound Stadium. It was inaugurated in 1948 and was originally a competition for British Bred Greyhounds only before switching to all-comers.
The event originally called the Regency Produce Stakes immediately attracted interest with 161 British Bred litters in the first year and over 200 litters in the 1949 edition and has remained a significant event.

From 1966 the competition dropped the Produce part from its name because the event was extended to all greyhounds and a new perpetual trophy was introduced.

The competition is a category 1 event on the annual greyhound racing calendar. In 2022, the event was sponsored by Premier Greyhound Racing an it doubled in prize money with a £20,000 winner's purse.

Past winners

Venues & Distances 
1948–1965 (Hove 525y)
1966–1974 (Hove 725y)
1975–1977 (Hove 670m)
1978–1980 (Hove 680m)
1981–1995 (Hove 740m)
1996–2003 (Hove 695m) 
2004–2005 (Hove 515m)
2006–present (Hove 695m)

Sponsors
2002–2002 (Trap6.com)
2003–2003 (Rendezvous Casino)
2004–2021 (Coral)
2022–present (Premier Greyhound Racing)

References

Greyhound racing competitions in the United Kingdom
Sport in Brighton and Hove
Recurring sporting events established in 1948
1948 establishments in England